Luby is a town in Cheb District in the Karlovy Vary Region of the Czech Republic. It has about 2,100 inhabitants. It is well known for its violin-making industry, and was once dubbed the "Austrian Cremona" when Bohemia was part of Austria-Hungary.

Administrative parts

Villages of Dolní Luby, Horní Luby and Opatov are administrative parts of Luby.

History

The area was probably settled between 1100 and 1140. The first written mention of Luby is from 1158. In 1185, it was mentioned as a property of the Waldsassen Abbey. Construction of a church started in 1188. The village was promoted to a town in 1319. In 1354, it became a royal property.

During the mid-13th century, mercury ore, particularly the vermilion variety, was mined in the area of Horní Luby. In the 16th century, the ore was regarded as the most important in Central Europe. In 1536, about 200 miners had produced about 13.5 tons of cinnabar from several local mines.

During the Thirty Years' War, the mining came to a complete standstill. In the latter half of the 17th century, Schönbach flourished as a centre of violin making.

In 1867–1918, Schönbach was part of the Austro-Hungarian Empire. The village was located within the boundaries of the Eger District created by the Austria-Hungary monarchy. In 1899–1900, Schönbach gained access to electricity and the railroad, which helped the development of the industry.

The Austro-Hungarian Empire collapsed in 1918, after World War I, and Schönbach became part of Czechoslovakia. In 1929, about 1,500 Schönbach craftsmen were employed making string instruments. In 1938, following the Great Depression, Germany annexed the western region of Czechoslovakia and administered in as Reichsgau Sudetenland, and occupied it until the end of World War II.

In 1946, right after World War II, Czechoslovakia restored the pre-1938 border and changed the German name Schönbach to the Czech name Luby. In 1949, residents with German ethnicity were expelled from Czechoslovakia. About two-thirds of the Luby population were German, among which, about 1,600 were instrument makers. The instrument makers mostly settled in Bubenreuth of Erlangen, which, before then, only had about 500 residents. Bubenreuth was, at that time, in the American zone of occupied Germany, and therefore was within West Germany afterwards.

Demographics

Economy

There were several notable luthiers and music instrument companies in Luby, including Höfner, Hoyer Guitars, John Juzek, and Plachta, Sander and Schuster families. Framus company was also founded here. Before World War II, Luby was the largest centre of violin production in the world.

In 1948, when the communist party took power in Czechoslovakia, the production of music instruments was nationalized and unified into a single Luby-based company called Cremona (part of Československé hudební nástroje in 1965–1992) that had been in existence since 1920. All manufactures and small workshops were part of this company. In 1992, Cremona was privatized and renamed Strunal CZ, a.s., which since was exported under the label of Josef Jan Dvořák (for bowed instruments) and Strunal or Amada (for guitars). Strunal filed for bankruptcy in 2020. Several smaller companies continue the tradition in the town.

Education
From 1873 to 2005, the Violin Making School was located in Luby. In 2005, it was moved to Cheb.

Notable people
John Juzek (1892 – c. 1965), exporter of orchestral string instruments; worked and died here
Herta Huber (born 1926), German writer and poet

Twin towns – sister cities

Luby is twinned with:
 Bubenreuth, Germany
 Markneukirchen, Germany

References

External links

Cities and towns in the Czech Republic
Populated places in Cheb District